Richard Abernathy was a college football player.

Vanderbilt University
Abernathy was a prominent end for Dan McGugin's Vanderbilt Commodores of Vanderbilt University from 1927 and 1929.

1928
In 1928, Abernathy began the season with two touchdown catches against Chattanooga in a 20–0 win. He also caught a 38–yard touchdown pass that helped Vanderbilt defeat Colgate 12–7. In Dallas, Abernathy blocked a punt that was recovered in the end zone. The resulting touchdown gave the Commodores' a 13–12 win over Texas. At year's end he was selected  All-American.

Chautauqua
Abernathy advertised Redpath Chautauqua.

References

Year of birth missing
Year of death missing
American football ends
Vanderbilt Commodores football players
All-Southern college football players
All-American college football players